Lithuania competed at the 2012 Winter Youth Olympics in Innsbruck, Austria. Lithuania was represented by 6 athletes in three sports.

Agnė Sereikaitė won a quota place in short track speed skating but did not compete at the games.

Alpine skiing

Lithuania has qualified two skiers in alpine skiing.

Boys

Girls

Biathlon

Lithuania has qualified two skiers in biathlon.

Boys

Girls

Mixed

Cross country skiing

Lithuania has qualified two skiers in cross country skiing.

Boys

Girls

Sprint

Mixed

See also
Lithuania at the 2012 Summer Olympics

References

2012 in Lithuanian sport
Nations at the 2012 Winter Youth Olympics
Lithuania at the Youth Olympics